The Israeli Air Intelligence Group (also known as Lamdan, its Hebrew acronym) is a unit of the Israel Defense Forces Air Force. Like other IDF intelligence gathering bodies, it is professionally subordinate to the IDF's Intelligence Directorate. 

Lamdan is responsible for the formulation of the aerial intelligence picture, and participates in forging the overall intelligence view as part of the Israeli Intelligence Community. It operates several research and collection units, including the Technical Assistance Unit (formerly the Air Photography Unit) which analyzes aerial photography, and the Zoom Unit which studies the procurement of new aircraft. Lamdan also operates alongside Aman's Visual Intelligence Branch and the Naval Intelligence Division's Visual Intelligence Unit. Lamdan is currently headed by Brigadier-General Amir Gat.

Israeli intelligence agencies
Israeli Air Force
Israel Defense Forces
Military Intelligence Directorate (Israel)